John Filak (October 13, 1903 – September 29, 1954) was an American football player. 

Filak played college football for Penn State from 1924 to 1926. Coach Hugo Bezdek rated Filak as the team's best tackle in 1925. He also played professional football in the National Football League (NFL) for the Frankford Yellow Jackets. He appeared in 39 NFL games, 18 as a starter, during the 1927, 1928, and 1929 seasons. He also reportedly played for the Green Bay Packers in 1941.

Filak also trained as a boxer under Leo Florian Hauck. After retiring from football, he owned and operated a confectionery store in Newark, New Jersey. He died in 1954 at age 49 a Beth Israel Hospital in Newark.

References

1903 births
1954 deaths
East Side High School (Newark, New Jersey) alumni
Penn State Nittany Lions football players
Frankford Yellow Jackets players
Players of American football from New York (state)
Players of American football from Newark, New Jersey